Dimorphococcus is a genus of fresh water green algae in the family Scenedesmaceae.

Dimorphococcus is usually found in small colonies of multiples of four cells, surrounded by a gelatinous mass.

References

External links
 Pictures and description of Dimorphococcus

Sphaeropleales genera
Sphaeropleales